The 1981 Australian Formula 2 Championship was an Australian motor racing competition open to Australian Formula 2 racing cars. It was the 14th Australian Formula 2 Championship to be awarded by the Confederation of Australian Motor Sport.

The title was won by John Smith driving a Ralt RT1 Ford.

Calendar

The championship was contested over a six-round series.

All rounds were staged over two heats except for the final round at Calder, which was contested as a single race.

Points system
Championship points were awarded on a 9-6-4-3-2-1 basis for the first six positions at each round. 
Where a round was contested over two heats, points were allocated on a 20-16-13-11-10-9-8-7-6-5-4-3-2-1 basis for the first 14 positions in each heat and then aggregated for each driver to determine the first six positions for the round.

Results

Notes & references

Australian Formula 2 Championship
Formula 2 Championship